Bachkitau (Baśqıtaw) is a rural locality (a village) in Novoyanzigitovsky Selsoviet, Krasnokamsky District, Bashkortostan, Russia. The population was 270 as of 2010. There are 4 streets.

Geography 
Bachkitau is located 51 km south of Nikolo-Beryozovka (the district's administrative centre) by road. Staroyanzigitovo is the nearest rural locality.

References 

Rural localities in Krasnokamsky District